Lever-action is a type of action for repeating firearms that uses a manually operated cocking handle located around the trigger guard area (often incorporating it) that pivots forward to move the bolt via internal linkages, which will feed and extract cartridges into and out of the chamber, and cock the firing pin mechanism. This contrasts to other type of repeating actions such as the bolt-action, pump-action, semi-automatic, or automatic/selective-fire actions. A firearm using this operating mechanism is colloquially referred to as a levergun.

Most lever-action firearms are rifles, but some lever-action shotguns and a few pistols have been made. The Winchester Model 1873 rifle is one of the most famous lever-action firearms, but many manufacturers (notably Henry and Marlin) also produce lever-action rifles. Even Colt's Mfg. Co. produced the 6403 lever-action Colt-Burgess rifles from 1883 until 1885. Mossberg produces the Mossberg model 464 in centerfire .30-30 and rimfire .22.

History

In 1826, a lever-action revolver capable of firing six shots in less than six seconds was produced in Italy by Cesar Rosaglio and patented in 1829.

The first lever-action rifles on the market were likely the Colt's 1st and 2nd Model Ring Lever rifles, both cap and ball rifles, produced by the Patent Arms Mfg. Co. Paterson, N.J.-Colt's Patent between 1837 and 1841. The ring lever was located in front of the trigger. This loading lever, when pulled, would index the cylinder to the next position and cock the internal hidden hammer.

 

Multiple lever-action designs including the Volcanic pistol were designed before the American Civil War, but the first significant designs were the Spencer repeating rifle and Henry rifle both created in 1860. The Spencer was a lever-operated rifle with a removable seven-round tube magazine designed by Christopher Spencer. Over 20,000 were made, and it was adopted by the United States and used during the American Civil War, which marked the first adoption of an infantry and cavalry rifle with a removable magazine by any country. The early Spencer's rifle lever only served to unlock the action and chamber a new round; the hammer had to be cocked separately after chambering.

The Henry rifle, invented by Benjamin Tyler Henry, a gunsmith employed by Oliver Winchester, had a centrally located hammer that was cocked by the rearward movement of the bolt rather than an offset hammer typical of muzzle-loading rifles. Henry also placed the magazine under the barrel rather than in the buttstock, a trend followed by most tube magazines ever since.

John Marlin, founder of Marlin Firearms Company, New Haven, Connecticut, introduced Marlin's first lever-action repeating rifle as the Model 1881. This was chambered in rounds such as .45-70 Government and .38-55 Winchester. Its successor was the 1895 solid top design, which is known as the Marlin 336 today. It also gave rise to the Marlin Model 1894, which is still in production.

By the 1890s, lever-actions had evolved into a form that would last for over a century. Both Marlin and Winchester released new model lever-action rifles in 1894. The Marlin rifle is still in production, whereas production of the Winchester 94 ceased in 2006. While externally similar, the Marlin and Winchester rifles are different internally. The Marlin has a single-stage lever-action, whilst the Winchester has a double-stage lever. The double-stage action is easily seen when the Winchester's lever is operated, as the entire trigger group drops down to unlock the bolt which then moves rearward to eject the spent cartridge.

The fledgling Savage Arms Company became well known after the development of its popular hammerless Models 1895 and 1899 (which became named the Model 99) lever-action sporting rifles. The Models 1895/99 were produced from the introduction in 1899 until the expense of producing the rifle and declining interest in lever-action rifles from the 1950s onwards, resulted in dropping the Model 99 from production in 1998. Unlike most Winchester and the Marlin lever-action rifles which used a tubular magazine requiring round nose or flat nose bullets, Arthur Savage designed his rifle using a rotary magazine. This allowed the 99 to use cartridges with Spitzer-pointed bullets for increased ballistic performance. The 99 was produced in many different cartridges and several different model variations. The final models eliminated the very expensive to produce rotary magazines, using a detachable box magazine instead. Despite this, the Model 99 was still very expensive to produce when compared to other lever-action rifles and combined with the affordability of the Savage bolt-action rifle, the Model 99 was discontinued.

Sturm Ruger and Company introduced a number of new lever-action designs in the 1990s.

Use in warfare 

The Henry Lever-Action was used in the US Civil War and was used in the US until the Winchester Model 1866 rifle replaced it. The Spencer repeating rifle was also used in the US Civil War. Additionally, rifles using the lever-action design were used extensively during the 1930s by irregular forces in the Spanish Civil War. Typically, these were Winchesters or Winchester copies of Spanish manufacture. At least 9,000 Model 1895 rifles are known to have been provided by the Soviet Union in 1936 to the Spanish Republicans for use in the Spanish Civil War. Both the Russian Empire and the United States adopted the Winchester Model 1895 as a military weapon.

Shotguns 

Early attempts at repeating shotguns invariably centered around either bolt-action or lever-action designs, drawing obvious inspiration from the repeating rifles of the time. The earliest successful repeating shotgun was the lever-action Winchester Model 1887, designed by John Browning in 1885 at the behest of the Winchester Repeating Arms Company. The lever-action design was chosen for reasons of brand recognition despite the protestations of Browning, who pointed out that a slide action design would be much better for a shotgun. Initially chambered for black powder shotgun shells (as was standard at the time), the Model 1887 gave rise to the Winchester Model 1901, a strengthened version chambered for 10ga smokeless powder shells. Their popularity waned after the introduction of slide action shotguns such as the Winchester Model 1897, and production was discontinued in 1920. Modern reproductions are manufactured by Armi Chiappa in Italy, Norinco in China, and ADI Ltd. in Australia. Winchester continued to manufacture the .410 bore Model 9410, which is effectively a Winchester Model 94 chambered for .410 bore shotgun shells, until 2006.

Australian firearm laws strictly control pump and semi-automatic actions. Lever operation falls into a more lenient category, hence the recent popularity of lever-action in that country.

Other applications 

A one-off example of lever-action reloading on automatic firearms is the M1895 Colt–Browning machine gun. This weapon had a swinging lever beneath its barrel that was actuated by a gas bleed in the barrel, unlocking the breech to reload. This unique operation gave the nickname "potato digger," as the lever swung each time the weapon fired and would dig into the ground if the weapon was not situated high enough on its mount.

The Knötgen automatic rifle is another example.

Cartridges 

The cartridges for lever-action rifles have a wide variety of calibers, bullet shapes, and powder loads which fall into two categories: Low-pressure cartridges with rounded bullets, and high-pressure cartridges with aerodynamic pointed ("spitzer") bullets.

Some lever-actions are not as strong as bolt action or semi-automatic rifle actions. The weaker actions utilize low- and medium-pressure cartridges, somewhat similar to high-powered pistol ammunition. To increase the bullet's energy at relatively low velocities, these often have larger, heavier bullets than other types of rifles. The most common cartridge is the .30-30 Winchester, introduced by Winchester with the Model 1894. Other common cartridges include: .38 Special/.357 Magnum, .44 Special/.44 Magnum, .41 Magnum, .444 Marlin, .45-70, .45 Colt, .32-20 Winchester, .35 Remington, .308 Marlin Express, .22 calibre rimfire, and .300 Savage. There is some dispute about which of these cartridges can safely be used to hunt large game or large predators. Even in the largest calibers, the low velocities give these cartridges much lower energies than Elephant gun cartridges with comparable calibers. However, even the smallest cartridges fit lightweight, handy rifles that can be excellent for hunting small herbivores, pest control, and personal defense.

Some stronger, larger pistols (usually revolvers) also accept some of these cartridges, permitting the use of the same ammunition in both a pistol and rifle. The rifle's longer barrel and better accuracy permit higher velocities, longer ranges, and a wider selection of game. 

Some of these cartridges (e.g. the .45-70) are developmental descendants of very early black powder metallic cartridges. When metallic cartridges and lever-actions were first invented, very small, portable kits were developed for hand reloading and bullet molding (so-called "cowboy reloading kits"). These kits are still available for most low-pressure lever-action cartridges.

Stronger lever-actions, such as the action of the Marlin Model 1894, can utilize high-pressure cartridges. Lever-action designs with strong, rotary locking bolts (such as the Browning BLR with seven locking lugs) safely use very high-powered cartridges like the .300 Winchester Magnum, .300 WSM, and 7 mm Remington Magnum. Tilting block designs such as the Savage Model 99 are also strong enough to handle high pressures.

Many lever-actions have a tubular magazine under the barrel. To operate safely, cartridges for these have bullets with rounded tips, and some use rimfire primers rather than centerfire primers. The safety problem is that long-range aerodynamic supersonic bullets are pointed. In a tubular magazine, the points can accidentally fire centerfire cartridges.  A related problem is that some pointed bullets have fragile tips, and can be damaged in a tubular magazine. Some lever-actions such as the Savage Model 99 can be fed from either box or rotary magazines. The Winchester Model 1895 also uses a box magazine, and is chambered for .30-06 and other powerful military cartridges. More recently, spitzer bullets with elastomeric tips have been developed.

Lever-action shotguns such as the Winchester Model 1887 were chambered in 10 or 12-gauge black powder shotgun shells, whereas the Model 1901 was chambered for 10-gauge smokeless shotshells. Modern reproductions are chambered for 12 gauge smokeless shells, while the Winchester Model 9410 shotgun is available in .410 bore.

Comparison to bolt-action rifles 

While lever-action rifles have always been popular with hunters and sporting shooters, they have not been widely accepted by the military. Several reasons for that have been proposed.

One significant reason for this is that it is harder to fire from the prone position with a lever-action rifle than it is with a bolt-action with either a straight pull or rotating bolt.

While lever-action rifles generally possess a greater rate of fire than bolt-action rifles, that was not always a feature, since, until about the turn of the 20th century, most militaries were wary of it being too high, afraid that excessive round consumption would put a strain on logistics and military industry.

Tubular magazines, similar to the one used on the first bolt-action rifle and used on hunting lever-action rifles to this day, is sometimes described as a problem: while it is indeed incompatible with pointed centerfire "spitzer" bullets developed in the 1890s (discounting recently invented elastomer-tipped ones) due to the point of each cartridge's projectile resting on the primer of the next cartridge in the magazine, lever-action rifles actually adapted for military use (such as the Winchester Model 1895, which saw service with the Russian Army in World War I) were fitted with a box magazine invented in the late 1870s.

Another explanation for the lack of widespread use of lever-action designs stems from the initial inability to fire high-pressure cartridges made possible by the invention of smokeless powder in the 1880s. Safe operation could only be carried out by using low-pressure cartridges in the toggle-lock lever-action rifles such as the Henry rifle and the following Winchester Model 1866, Model 73, and Model 76 (which was used by the mounted police of Canada). The new lever-action designs, notably the Winchester Model 1886, Model 92, Model 94, and the Model 1895 (in 7.62x54R, a Russian military cartridge), with a strong locking-block action designed by John Moses Browning, were capable of firing higher-pressure cartridges.

In the end, the problem was economical. By the time these rifles became available in the late 19th century, militaries worldwide had put cheap bolt-action rifles into service and were unwilling to invest in producing more expensive lever-action rifles.

Due to the higher rate of fire and shorter overall length than most bolt-action rifles, lever-actions have remained popular to this day for sporting use, especially short- and medium-range hunting in forests, scrub, or bushland. Lever-action firearms have also been used in some quantity by prison guards in the United States, as well as by wildlife authorities in many parts of the world.
	
Many newer lever-action rifles are capable of shooting groups smaller than 1 minute of angle (MOA), making their accuracy equal to the accuracy of most modern bolt-action rifles.

Additionally, another advantage over typical bolt-action rifles is the lack of handedness: lever-actions, like pump actions, are frequently recommended as ambidextrous in sporting guidebooks.

See also 

 Antique guns
 Rapid fire crossbow

References

Firearm actions
 Lever-action